Traxx is a maze game released in 1983 by Quicksilva for the ZX Spectrum (48K) and VIC-20 (+8K). The gameplay is similar to Amidar, where the goal is to color all of the lines on a grid of equally-sized squares. Unlike Amidar, the sections of the grid are not captured when surrounded; the goal is purely to color all of the lines.

Gameplay 
The player moves along a rectangular grid painting all of its sections. The level ends when the entire grid has been painted. Various enemies also inhabit the grid and will try to kill the player.

References

External links 

1983 video games
Maze games
Multiplayer and single-player video games
Multiplayer hotseat games
Quicksilva games
VIC-20 games
Video game clones
Video games developed in the United Kingdom
ZX Spectrum games